No Security is a compilation album by hip hop group D-Block aka The LOX. It was released on June 9, 2009 on E1 Music. The album will officially introduce many of the members that make up D-Block and will also be a minor stepping stone to the New L.O.X. Order.  It debuted at #40 on the Billboard 200, selling 12,000 copies in its first week.  To date the album has sold over 86,000 copies. This album contains The Lox with new D-Block artist such as Bully, Bucky, Straw, Snyp Life, Don-D, T.Y., Large Amount, A.P. and Tommy Star.

Music videos were released for the singles "Get That Paper" and "So Much Trouble". The end of the video for "So Much Trouble" features a verse from the song "From The Block".

Track listing

Notes
* Track 12 contains 3 hidden tracks which commence at 5:54, 9:31 & 13:17)

References

E1 Music albums
Albums produced by Scram Jones
Albums produced by Pete Rock
2009 compilation albums
D-Block Records compilation albums
The Lox albums
Gangsta rap compilation albums